Raikes Farmhouse is an historic building in Thornton-Cleveleys, Lancashire, England. Replacing a building dating from at least 1595, the current structure was built in 1692, with a rear extension added in the 19th century. It has been designated a Grade II listed building by Historic England. The property is located on Raikes Road, just southeast of its junction (a roundabout) with Stanah Road and Hillylaid Road.

The property was renovated sometime between 2011 and 2019, a process that removed its pebbledashing.

In 2014, a planning application was made to demolish three barns and erect six dwellings on the property, but the application was later withdrawn.

History
For much of the 20th century and the early part of the 21st century, the property was owned by the Hodgkinson family. Thomas Hodgkinson died in 2008, aged 87; his wife, Eunice, died three years later.

A tablet, made of sandstone, is visible on the building's right gable, with the initials "B. T. S." and the year "1692".

Gallery

See also
Listed buildings in Thornton-Cleveleys

References

Sources

1692 establishments in England
Houses completed in 1692
Grade II listed buildings in Lancashire
Houses in Lancashire
Farmhouses in England
Buildings and structures in the Borough of Wyre
The Fylde